The Journal of Antimicrobial Chemotherapy is a peer-reviewed medical journal which covers antimicrobial chemotherapy, including laboratory aspects and clinical use of antimicrobial agents. It is published by Oxford University Press on behalf of the British Society for Antimicrobial Chemotherapy and was established in 1975. In January 2015 J. Peter Donnelly (Radboud University Nijmegen Medical Centre) became the eighth editor-in-chief replacing Alan P. Johnson (Health Protection Agency, London, United Kingdom). The journal has had two previous publishers. All content is available for free after 12 months while authors also have the option to have their articles published immediately as open access.

History
The Journal of Antimicrobial Chemotherapy was founded by David Williams in 1975, who was also its editor for its first six years.

Abstracting and indexing 
The journal is abstracted and indexed in:

According to the Journal Citation Reports, the journal received a 2017 impact factor of 5.217, ranking it 8th out of 88 journals in the category Infectious Diseases, 19th out of 126 journals in the category Microbiology, and 19th out of 261 journals in the category Pharmacology & Pharmacy.

References

Further reading

External links
 
British Society for Antimicrobial Chemotherapy

Delayed open access journals
Publications established in 1975
Pharmacology journals
Microbiology journals
English-language journals
Oxford University Press academic journals
Hybrid open access journals
Monthly journals